Donny Gluckstein (born 1954) is a British historian at Edinburgh College. He went to the University of Warwick in 1974 and graduated in history.

The son of Tony Cliff and Chanie Rosenberg, he is the author of numerous books and articles.  In 2013 his book A People's History of the Second World War was shortlisted for the Bread and Roses Award.

Selected works 
The Western Soviets: Workers' Councils versus Parliament, 1915-20 (London: Bookmarks: 1985).
Marxism and Trade Union Struggle: The General Strike of 1926 (co-authored with Tony Cliff) (London: Bookmarks, 1986).
The Labour Party: A Marxist history (coauthored with Tony Cliff) (London: Bookmarks: 1988/1996).
The Tragedy of Bukharin (London: Pluto, 1994). 
The Nazis, Capitalism and the Working Class (London: Bookmarks, 1999, and Chicago: Haymarket, 2012).  
The Paris Commune: A Revolution in Democracy (London: Bookmarks: 2006, and Chicago: Haymarket, 2011). 
A People's History of the Second World War: Resistance versus Empire (London: Pluto, 2012). 
Fighting on all fronts: Popular Resistance in the Second World War (editor) (London: Bookmarks: 2015).
Hegel and Revolution (co-authored with Terry Sullivan) (London: Bookmarks, 2020).

References

External links
The Donny Gluckstein Internet Archive Articles at Marxists.org
Articles for Socialist Review.
Profile at Haymarket Books
Interview with Donny Gluckstein from 2012 at New Left Project.

Living people
British historians
British Marxists
British Jews
1954 births
Jewish socialists